The 1984 Badminton World Cup was the sixth edition of an international tournament Badminton World Cup. The event was held in Jakarta, Indonesia from 18 September to 23 September 1984. China won titles in 3 disciplines : Both the singles events and Women's doubles. Indonesia won Men's doubles while cross country pair from Sweden and England won the mixed doubles title.

Medalists

Men's singles

Finals

Women's singles

Finals

Men's doubles

Finals

Women's doubles

Finals

Mixed doubles

Finals

References 
 https://web.archive.org/web/20061214225126/http://tangkis.tripod.com/world/1984.htm
 Han Jian's title
 King bows to Han dynasty
 Pemain2 China terbukti gagah

Badminton World Cup
1984 in badminton
1984 in Indonesian sport
Sports competitions in Jakarta
International sports competitions hosted by Indonesia